Julian Tepper (born April 1, 1979) is an American writer and musician. His novels include Balls (2012), Ark (2016), and Between the Records (2020). He co-founded the Oracle Club, a literary salon in New York City that was open from 2011 until 2017, and was formerly a member of the indie rock band The Natural History.

Early life
Tepper was born in New York City and raised on Manhattan's Upper East Side. His father, Robert Tepper, is a musician best known for writing the 1980 ballad "Into the Night" and for writing and recording "No Easy Way Out", which appeared in the 1985 film Rocky IV.

Career

Novels
Tepper's debut novel, Balls, was published in 2012. The book is a dark comedy about Henry Schiller, a 30-year-old piano player and neurotic Jew who lives in Manhattan with his younger, more musically gifted girlfriend Paula. When Henry discovers that he has testicular cancer, it prompts an existential crisis. The book has been praised for capturing the feel of New York City. Tepper started writing it in New Orleans and continued it in Finland, but stated that the book didn't start to take form until he returned to New York. Tepper has said Balls was influenced by Saul Bellow's 1964 novel Herzog, as well as the work of Fyodor Dostoyevsky, Franz Kafka and Woody Allen.

Tepper's second novel, Ark, was published in 2016. Set in Manhattan, it follows three generations of the formerly wealthy, artistic, infighting Arkin family. Some of the characters were based on Tepper's real-life family members. The New York Times wrote, "Despite some early stumbles, 'Ark' is an engaging and entertaining novel, and an insightful take on just how easy it can be to slip from the upper class."

In 2016, Tepper stated that he is working on an autobiographical novel tentatively titled Between the Records, based on his own, as well as his family's, life in music. An excerpt of Between the Records appeared in the May/June 2018 Issue of Playboy magazine.

The Oracle Club
Tepper and artist Jenna Gribbon founded The Oracle Club in 2011, a members-only literary salon and workspace for artists and writers in Long Island City, Queens, which closed in 2017.

Music
Tepper played bass in The Natural History, an indie rock trio formed in New York in 2001, with his brother Max Tepper on lead vocals and guitar. He co-wrote their song "Don’t You Ever", which was covered by Spoon as "Don't You Evah" on their 2007 album Ga Ga Ga Ga Ga, and was also released as a single/EP on April 8, 2008. The original version by The Natural History was included on the 8-song EP, alongside remixes of the Spoon version by Ted Leo, Diplo and Matthew Dear. Spoon included "Don't You Evah" on Everything Hits at Once: The Best of Spoon, released by Matador Records in July 2019. An article written for Playboy magazine by Julian Tepper includes a Q & A with Spoon's Britt Daniel, in which the Tepper brothers and Daniel recount the story behind "Don't You Evah".

The Natural History released an EP and two full-length albums and disbanded in 2005.

Bibliography

Books
 Balls (Rare Bird Books, 2012)
 Ark (Dzanc Books, 2016)
 Between the Records (Rare Bird Books, 2020)

Essays
 "Dr. Collier," The Paris Review, August 1, 2012
 "In Which Philip Roth Gave Me Life Advice," The Paris Review, December 25, 2012 
 "The Strange Story Behind Spoon's "Don't You Evah"—and the Overlooked Band That Wrote It," Playboy, August 1, 2019

Discography
 The Natural History (EP on Startime International, 2002)
 Beat Beat Heartbeat (LP on Startime International, 2003)
 People That I Meet (LP on Beat Beat Beat, 2007)

Filmography
 Extremely Loud & Incredibly Close (as Deli Waiter, dir. Stephen Daldry, 2011)
 Gossip Girl (as himself, "Salon of the Dead", season 5, episode 20, April 16, 2012)

References

External links
 
 The Oracle Club website
 

Living people
1979 births
21st-century American novelists
Writers from Manhattan
American male novelists
Jewish American novelists
American rock bass guitarists
American male bass guitarists
People from the Upper East Side
21st-century American male writers
Novelists from New York (state)
21st-century American bass guitarists
21st-century American male musicians
21st-century American Jews